Zbigniew Jan Zapasiewicz (13 September 1934 – 14 July 2009) was one of the most prominent post-war Polish actors, as well as a theatre director and pedagogue.

Biography 
Zbigniew Zapasiewicz was born on 13 September 1934 in Warsaw, Poland. During 1951–1952 he studied chemistry at the Warsaw University of Technology. In 1956 he graduated in acting from the National Academy of Theatre in Warsaw (now Aleksander Zelwerowicz State Theatre Academy). He made his debut in 1955 in the Theatre of New Warsaw.

During 1959–1966 Zapasiewicz was an actor of the Contemporary Theatre. In 1982 he moved to Teatr Powszechny. During 1987–1990 he was a managing director of the Dramatic Theatre. Since 1993 he acted at the Contemporary Theatre.

Zapasiewicz died in Warsaw on 14 July 2009, at the age of 74.

Filmography

References 
Inline

General

External links 
 
 

1934 births
2009 deaths
Male actors from Warsaw
Polish educators
Polish male film actors
Polish male stage actors
Polish theatre directors
Aleksander Zelwerowicz National Academy of Dramatic Art in Warsaw alumni
Recipients of the State Award Badge (Poland)
Burials at Powązki Military Cemetery
Recipient of the Meritorious Activist of Culture badge